Nucleotides are organic molecules composed of a  nitrogenous base, a pentose sugar and a phosphate. They serve as monomeric units of the nucleic acid polymers – deoxyribonucleic acid (DNA) and ribonucleic acid (RNA),  both of which are essential biomolecules within all life-forms on Earth. Nucleotides are obtained in the diet and are also synthesized from common nutrients by the liver.

Nucleotides are composed of three subunit molecules: a nucleobase, a five-carbon sugar (ribose or deoxyribose), and a phosphate group consisting of one to three phosphates.  The four nucleobases in DNA are guanine, adenine, cytosine and thymine; in RNA, uracil is used in place of thymine.

Nucleotides also play a central role in metabolism at a fundamental, cellular level. They provide chemical energy—in the form of the nucleoside triphosphates, adenosine triphosphate (ATP), guanosine triphosphate (GTP), cytidine triphosphate (CTP) and uridine triphosphate (UTP)—throughout the cell for the many cellular functions that demand energy, including: amino acid, protein and cell membrane synthesis, moving the cell and cell parts (both internally and intercellularly), cell division, etc. In addition, nucleotides participate in cell signaling (cyclic guanosine monophosphate or cGMP and cyclic adenosine monophosphate or cAMP), and are incorporated into important cofactors of enzymatic reactions (e.g. coenzyme A, FAD, FMN, NAD, and NADP+).

In experimental biochemistry, nucleotides can be radiolabeled using radionuclides to yield radionucleotides.

5-nucleotides are also used in flavour enhancers as food additive to enhance the umami taste, often in the form of a yeast extract.

Structure 

A nucleotide is composed of three distinctive chemical sub-units: a five-carbon sugar molecule, a nucleobase (the two of which together are called a nucleoside), and one phosphate group. With all three joined, a nucleotide is also termed a "nucleoside monophosphate", "nucleoside diphosphate" or "nucleoside triphosphate", depending on how many phosphates make up the phosphate group.

In nucleic acids, nucleotides contain either a purine or a pyrimidine base—i.e., the nucleobase molecule, also known as a nitrogenous base—and are termed ribonucleotides if the sugar is ribose, or deoxyribonucleotides if the sugar is deoxyribose. Individual phosphate molecules repetitively connect the sugar-ring molecules in two adjacent nucleotide monomers, thereby connecting the nucleotide monomers of a nucleic acid end-to-end into a long chain. These chain-joins of sugar and phosphate molecules create a 'backbone' strand for a single- or double helix. In any one strand, the chemical orientation (directionality) of the chain-joins runs from the 5'-end to the 3'-end (read: 5 prime-end to 3 prime-end)—referring to the five carbon sites on sugar molecules in adjacent nucleotides. In a double helix, the two strands are oriented in opposite directions, which permits base pairing and complementarity between the base-pairs, all which is essential for replicating or transcribing the encoded information found in DNA.

Nucleic acids then are polymeric macromolecules assembled from nucleotides, the monomer-units of nucleic acids. The purine bases adenine and guanine and pyrimidine base cytosine occur in both DNA and RNA, while the pyrimidine bases thymine (in DNA) and uracil (in RNA) occur in just one. Adenine forms a base pair with thymine with two hydrogen bonds, while guanine pairs with cytosine with three hydrogen bonds.

In addition to being building blocks for the construction of nucleic acid polymers, singular nucleotides play roles in cellular energy storage and provision, cellular signaling, as a source of phosphate groups used to modulate the activity of proteins and other signaling molecules, and as enzymatic cofactors, often carrying out redox reactions.  Signaling cyclic nucleotides are formed by binding the phosphate group twice to the same sugar molecule, bridging the 5'- and 3'- hydroxyl groups of the sugar.  Some signaling nucleotides differ from the standard single-phosphate group configuration, in having multiple phosphate groups attached to different positions on the sugar.  Nucleotide cofactors include a wider range of chemical groups attached to the sugar via the glycosidic bond, including nicotinamide and flavin, and in the latter case, the ribose sugar is linear rather than forming the ring seen in other nucleotides.

Synthesis
Nucleotides can be synthesized by a variety of means, both in vitro and in vivo.

In vitro, protecting groups may be used during laboratory production of nucleotides. A purified nucleoside is protected to create a phosphoramidite, which can then be used to obtain analogues not found in nature and/or to synthesize an oligonucleotide.

In vivo, nucleotides can be synthesized de novo or recycled through salvage pathways. The components used in de novo nucleotide synthesis are derived from biosynthetic precursors of carbohydrate and amino acid metabolism, and from ammonia and carbon dioxide. Recently it has been also demonstrated that cellular bicarbonate metabolism can be regulated by mTORC1 signaling. The liver is the major organ of de novo synthesis of all four nucleotides. De novo synthesis of pyrimidines and purines follows two different pathways. Pyrimidines are synthesized first from aspartate and carbamoyl-phosphate in the cytoplasm to the common precursor ring structure orotic acid, onto which a phosphorylated ribosyl unit is covalently linked. Purines, however, are first synthesized from the sugar template onto which the ring synthesis occurs. For reference, the syntheses of the purine and pyrimidine nucleotides are carried out by several enzymes in the cytoplasm of the cell, not within a specific organelle. Nucleotides undergo breakdown such that useful parts can be reused in synthesis reactions to create new nucleotides.

Pyrimidine ribonucleotide synthesis

The synthesis of the pyrimidines CTP and UTP occurs in the cytoplasm and starts with the formation of carbamoyl phosphate from glutamine and CO2. Next, aspartate carbamoyltransferase catalyzes a condensation reaction between aspartate and carbamoyl phosphate to form carbamoyl aspartic acid, which is cyclized into 4,5-dihydroorotic acid by dihydroorotase. The latter is converted to orotate by dihydroorotate oxidase. The net reaction is:

(S)-Dihydroorotate + O2 → Orotate + H2O2

Orotate is covalently linked with a phosphorylated ribosyl unit. The covalent linkage between the ribose and pyrimidine occurs at position C1 of the ribose unit, which contains a pyrophosphate, and N1 of the pyrimidine ring. Orotate phosphoribosyltransferase (PRPP transferase) catalyzes the net reaction yielding orotidine monophosphate (OMP):

Orotate + 5-Phospho-α-D-ribose 1-diphosphate (PRPP)  →  Orotidine 5'-phosphate + Pyrophosphate

Orotidine 5'-monophosphate is decarboxylated by orotidine-5'-phosphate decarboxylase to form uridine monophosphate (UMP). PRPP transferase catalyzes both the ribosylation and decarboxylation reactions, forming UMP from orotic acid in the presence of PRPP. It is from UMP that other pyrimidine nucleotides are derived.  UMP is phosphorylated by two kinases to uridine triphosphate (UTP) via two sequential reactions with ATP.  First, the diphosphate from UDP is produced, which in turn is phosphorylated to UTP. Both steps are fueled by ATP hydrolysis:

ATP + UMP → ADP + UDP

UDP + ATP → UTP + ADP

CTP is subsequently formed by the amination of UTP by the catalytic activity of CTP synthetase. Glutamine is the NH3 donor and the reaction is fueled by ATP hydrolysis, too:

UTP + Glutamine + ATP + H2O → CTP + ADP + Pi

Cytidine monophosphate (CMP) is derived from cytidine triphosphate (CTP) with subsequent loss of two phosphates.

Purine ribonucleotide synthesis

The atoms that are used to build the purine nucleotides come from a variety of sources:

The de novo synthesis of purine nucleotides by which these precursors are incorporated into the purine ring proceeds by a 10-step pathway to the branch-point intermediate IMP, the nucleotide of the base hypoxanthine. AMP and GMP are subsequently synthesized from this intermediate via separate, two-step pathways. Thus, purine moieties are initially formed as part of the ribonucleotides rather than as free bases.

Six enzymes take part in IMP synthesis. Three of them are multifunctional:
 GART (reactions 2, 3, and 5)
 PAICS (reactions 6, and 7)
 ATIC (reactions 9, and 10)

The pathway starts with the formation of PRPP. PRPS1 is the enzyme that activates R5P, which is formed primarily by the pentose phosphate pathway, to PRPP by reacting it with ATP. The reaction is unusual in that a pyrophosphoryl group is directly transferred from ATP to C1 of R5P and that the product has the α configuration about C1. This reaction is also shared with the pathways for the synthesis of Trp, His, and the pyrimidine nucleotides. Being on a major metabolic crossroad and requiring much energy, this reaction is highly regulated.

In the first reaction unique to purine nucleotide biosynthesis, PPAT catalyzes the displacement of PRPP's pyrophosphate group (PPi) by an amide nitrogen donated from either glutamine (N), glycine (N&C), aspartate (N), folic acid (C1), or CO2. This is the committed step in purine synthesis. The reaction occurs with the inversion of configuration about ribose C1, thereby forming β-5-phosphorybosylamine (5-PRA) and establishing the anomeric form of the future nucleotide.

Next, a glycine is incorporated fueled by ATP hydrolysis, and the carboxyl group forms an amine bond to the NH2 previously introduced. A one-carbon unit from folic acid coenzyme N10-formyl-THF is then added to the amino group of the substituted glycine followed by the closure of the imidazole ring. Next, a second NH2 group is transferred from glutamine to the first carbon of the glycine unit. A carboxylation of the second carbon of the glycin unit is concomitantly added. This new carbon is modified by the addition of a third NH2 unit, this time transferred from an aspartate residue. Finally, a second one-carbon unit from formyl-THF is added to the nitrogen group and the ring is covalently closed to form the common purine precursor inosine monophosphate (IMP).

Inosine monophosphate is converted to adenosine monophosphate in two steps. First, GTP hydrolysis fuels the addition of aspartate to IMP by adenylosuccinate synthase, substituting the carbonyl oxygen for a nitrogen and forming the intermediate adenylosuccinate. Fumarate is then cleaved off forming adenosine monophosphate. This step is catalyzed by adenylosuccinate lyase.

Inosine monophosphate is converted to guanosine monophosphate by the oxidation of IMP forming xanthylate, followed by the insertion of an amino group at C2.  NAD+ is the electron acceptor in the oxidation reaction. The amide group transfer from glutamine is fueled by ATP hydrolysis.

Pyrimidine and purine degradation
In humans, pyrimidine rings (C, T, U) can be degraded completely to CO2 and NH3 (urea excretion). That having been said, purine rings (G, A) cannot. Instead, they are degraded to the metabolically inert uric acid which is then excreted from the body. Uric acid is formed when GMP is split into the base guanine and ribose. Guanine is deaminated to xanthine which in turn is oxidized to uric acid. This last reaction is irreversible. Similarly, uric acid can be formed when AMP is deaminated to IMP from which the ribose unit is removed to form hypoxanthine. Hypoxanthine is oxidized to xanthine and finally to uric acid. Instead of uric acid secretion, guanine and IMP can be used for recycling purposes and nucleic acid synthesis in the presence of PRPP and aspartate (NH3 donor).

Prebiotic synthesis of nucleotides
Theories about the origin of life require knowledge of chemical pathways that permit formation of life’s key building blocks under plausible prebiotic conditions.  The RNA world hypothesis holds that in the primordial soup there existed free-floating ribonucleotides, the fundamental molecules that combine in series to form RNA.  Complex molecules like RNA must have arisen from small molecules whose reactivity was governed by physico-chemical processes.  RNA is composed of purine and pyrimidine nucleotides, both of which are necessary for reliable information transfer, and thus Darwinian evolution.  Becker et al. showed how pyrimidine nucleosides can be synthesized from small molecules and ribose, driven solely by wet-dry cycles.  Purine nucleosides can be synthesized by a similar pathway.  5’-mono- and di-phosphates also form selectively from phosphate-containing minerals, allowing concurrent formation of polyribonucleotides with both the purine and pyrimidine bases.  Thus a reaction network towards the purine and pyrimidine RNA building blocks can be established starting from simple atmospheric or volcanic molecules.

Unnatural base pair (UBP)

An unnatural base pair (UBP) is a designed subunit (or nucleobase) of DNA which is created in a laboratory and does not occur in nature. Examples include d5SICS and dNaM. These artificial nucleotides bearing hydrophobic nucleobases, feature two fused aromatic rings that form a (d5SICS–dNaM) complex or base pair in DNA. E. coli have been induced to replicate a plasmid containing UBPs through multiple generations. This is the first known example of a living organism passing along an expanded genetic code to subsequent generations.

Medical applications of synthetic nucleotides
Several nucleotide derivatives have been used as antivirals against hepatitis and HIV. Tenofovir disoproxil, Tenofovir alafenamide and Sofosbuvir are examples of NRTI used against hepatitis. Whereas certain drugs like Mericitabine, Lamivudine, Entecavir and Telbivudine for example are nucleosides, but they are metabolized into their bioactive nucleotide forms through phosphorylation.

Length unit 

Nucleotide (abbreviated "nt") is a common unit of length for single-stranded nucleic acids, similar to how base pair is a unit of length for double-stranded nucleic acids.

Abbreviation codes for degenerate bases 

The IUPAC has designated the symbols for nucleotides. Apart from the five (A, G, C, T/U) bases, often degenerate bases are used especially for designing PCR primers. These nucleotide codes are listed here.  Some primer sequences may also include the character "I", which codes for the non-standard nucleotide inosine.  Inosine occurs in tRNAs and will pair with adenine, cytosine, or thymine.  This character does not appear in the following table, however, because it does not represent a degeneracy.  While inosine can serve a similar function as the degeneracy "D", it is an actual nucleotide, rather than a representation of a mix of nucleotides that covers each possible pairing needed.

See also 

 Biology
 Chromosome
 Gene
 Genetics

References

Further reading 
 
 Freisinger, E., & Sigel, R. K. (2007). From nucleotides to ribozymes—a comparison of their metal ion binding properties. Coordination Chemistry Reviews, 251(13-14), 1834-1851.

External links
 Abbreviations and Symbols for Nucleic Acids, Polynucleotides and their Constituents (IUPAC)
 Provisional Recommendations 2004 (IUPAC)
 Chemistry explanation of nucleotide structure

 
DNA
Molecular biology